Tes Sambath (born 20 October 2000), is a Cambodian footballer that started his professional career at Boeung Ket. He is currently playing as a defender for C-League club Visakha, and the Cambodia national team.

Career statistics

International

References

External links
 

2000 births
Living people
Cambodian footballers
Cambodia international footballers
People from Takéo province
Association football midfielders
Visakha FC players
Cambodian Premier League players